Wim Tellier is a Belgian photographer and artist known for his installation projects using giant-size photographs. His projects have included covering 800 square meters of the Antwerp docks with six giant photos of elderly nude sunbathers, and his "Protect 7–7" project, the first installation art project in Antarctica, and one at Knokke-Heist in Belgium.

References

External links
 Documentary on the installation of Tellier's Antarctic project, at Spike
Photo gallery at the Princess Elisabeth Base

Belgian photographers
Living people
Year of birth missing (living people)